The forehand in tennis and other racket sports such as table tennis, squash and badminton is a shot made by swinging the racket across one's body with the hand moving palm-first.

Forehand may also refer to:
 People
 A. C. and Mamie Forehand, American gospel musicians active in 1927
 Edward "Little Buster" Forehand (19422006), American soul and blues musician
 Jennie M. Forehand (born 1935), American politician in Maryland
 Joe Forehand (born before 1971), American businessman
 Rex Forehand (born 1945), American psychologist

 Other
 Forehand (horse), the front half of a horse's body
 Turn on the forehand, a lateral movement in equestrian schooling

See also 
 Forehand & Wadsworth, a U.S. firearms manufacturing company